Michel Brunet may refer to:
 Michel Brunet (historian) (1917–1985), Canadian historian
 Michel Brunet (paleontologist) (born 1940), French paleontologist 
 Michel Brunet (figure skater) (born 1970), Canadian skater